Bambang may refer to

Places

Philippines 
 Bambang, Nueva Vizcaya
 Bambang (barangay) in Calaca, Batangas
 Bambang (barangay) in Pasig
 Bambang (barangay) in Taguig

Indonesia 
 Bambang, a district in the Mamasa Regency, West Sulawesi

People 
 Bambang Dwi Hartono, Mayor of Surabaya, 2002-2005 and 2005-2010
 Bambang Hendarso Danuri, Chief of National Police of Indonesia, 2008-2010
 Bambang Pamungkas, Indonesian footballer 
 Bambang Permadi Soemantri Brodjonegoro, Indonesian Minister of National Development Planning 
 Bambang Trihatmodjo, third son of Soeharto 
 Susilo Bambang Yudhoyono, President of Indonesia, 2004-2014